José Luis Exeni Rodríguez (born 1968, in La Paz, Bolivia) is the former chief judge of the National Electoral Court of Bolivia.

Exeni is a member of the Church of Jesus Christ of Latter-day Saints.

References

1968 births
Living people
21st-century Bolivian judges
Bolivian Latter Day Saints
Bolivian people of Arab descent
Magistrates of the Supreme Electoral Tribunal of Bolivia
Presidents of the Supreme Electoral Tribunal of Bolivia